Skid Row is the name of two rock bands; for their discographies see:

Skid Row (American band) discography
Skid Row (Irish band) discography